Spiroseris is a genus of Pakistani plants in the tribe Cichorieae within the family Asteraceae.

Species
The only known species is Spiroseris phyllocephala, native to Pakistan.

References

Flora of Pakistan
Cichorieae
Monotypic Asteraceae genera